List of Rulers of the Akan state of Bono-Tekyiman

Bonoman (Bono State) Kings

See also 
Akan people
Ghana
Gold Coast
Lists of incumbents

References

Akan state of Bono-Tekyiman